Paul Joseph Sally, Jr. (January 29, 1933 – December 30, 2013) was a professor of mathematics at the University of Chicago, where he was the Director of Undergraduate Studies for 30 years. His research areas were p-adic analysis and representation theory.

He created several programs to improve the preparation of school mathematics teachers, and was seen by many as "a legendary math professor at the University of Chicago."

Life and education
Sally was born in the Roslindale neighborhood of Boston, Massachusetts on January 29, 1933. He was a star basketball player at Boston College High School. He received his BS and MS degrees from Boston College in 1954 and 1956.

After a short career in Boston area high schools and at Boston College he entered the first class of mathematics graduate students at Brandeis in 1957  and earned his PhD in 1965. During his graduate career he married Judith D. Sally and had three children in three years. David, the oldest, is a Visiting Associate Professor of Business Administration at Tuck School of Business at Dartmouth College, Stephen is a partner at Ropes & Gray, and Paul, the youngest, is Superintendent at New Trier High School.

Sally was diagnosed with type 1 diabetes in 1948. The condition resulted in his use of an eye patch and two prosthetic legs, which caused him to be widely referred to as "Professor Pirate," and "The Math Pirate" around the University of Chicago campus.  He was known to detest cell phones in class and has destroyed several over the years by inviting students to stomp on them or by throwing them out of a window.

Career
Sally joined the University of Chicago faculty in 1965 and taught there until his death. He was a member of the Institute for Advanced Study from 1967–68, 1971–72, 1981–82, and 1983–84.

While at the IAS he collaborated with Joseph Shalika. In 1983, he became the first director of the University of Chicago School Mathematics Project, which is responsible for the Everyday Mathematics program (also called "Chicago math").

He founded Seminars for Elementary Specialists and Mathematics Educators (SESAME) in 1992. He co-founded the Young Scholars Program with Dr. Diane Herrmann in 1988, providing mathematical enrichment for gifted Chicago-area students in grades 7–12.

Death
Sally died December 30, 2013, aged 80, from congestive heart failure, at the University of Chicago Hospital.

Awards
 Amoco Foundation Award for Long-Term Excellence in Undergraduate Teaching, 1995
 American Mathematical Society Distinguished Service Award, 2000
 Deborah and Franklin Haimo Awards for Distinguished College or University Teaching of Mathematics of the Mathematical Association of America, 2002
 Fellow of the American Mathematical Society, 2012.

Selected publications

References

External links

1933 births
2013 deaths
20th-century American mathematicians
21st-century American mathematicians
Boston College alumni
Brandeis University alumni
University of Chicago faculty
Fellows of the American Mathematical Society
Boston College High School alumni
People from Roslindale
Mathematicians from Massachusetts
Institute for Advanced Study people